Issa Losseny Doumbia (born April 5, 1992  in Ivory Coast) is a Nigerien and Ivorian  football player who plays for Chippa United and the Niger national football team.

Career
Losseny Doumbia began his career in the Niger club ASFAN. In 2010, he moved to Motema Pembe from Equatorial Guinea. Now goalkeeper stands for Premier League club South Africa Chippa United.

Issa was competing with Rabo Saminou to be Niger's second choice goalkeeper at the 2012 Africa Cup of Nations finals in Gabon and Equatorial Guinea. He also was called to the national team of Niger as a reserve goalkeeper for the 2014 African cup of the Nation qualification (CAN).

References

1992 births
Living people
Nigerien footballers
Niger international footballers
Nigerien expatriate footballers
Chippa United F.C. players
Association football goalkeepers